The Shōgitai ("Manifest Righteousness Regiment") was an elite samurai shock infantry formation of the Tokugawa shogunate military formed in 1868 by the hatamoto  and Hitotsubashi Gosankyō retainer  in Zōshigaya, Edo (now Tokyo). The Shōgitai took a large part in the battles of the Boshin War, especially at the Battle of Toba–Fushimi, and, after being assigned the defence of Kan'ei-ji temple, the Battle of Ueno, where they were nearly annihilated.

After the Battle of Ueno, some surviving Shōgitai fled north, eventually joining the rebels of the Ezo Republic. Following the defeat of Ezo, most of the few remaining former Shōgitai settled in Hokkaido. Among the survivors was Toyohara Chikanobu, who later achieved fame as a master nishiki-e artist.

Notes

Boshin War
Military units and formations established in 1868